The Pulse was a Sirius Satellite Radio channel that played music "from the '90s and Today" on Sirius Satellite Radio channel 9 and Dish Network channel 6012.

The Pulse began on July 1, 2002 as part of the newly launched Sirius lineup, with the same music and format heard on the current Pulse.  By November 4, 2002, when I-90 signed off the air, it became a 1990s and hot AC hybrid, even though it played 1990s urban music.

Every half-hour, the old incarnation of The Pulse reviewed music news on tours, future albums, and other topics covered.

As part of the merger between Sirius and XM Satellite Radio, and the subsequent reorganization of the services' respective channel lineups on November 12, 2008, the old Pulse was replaced by The 90s on 9, bringing a 1990s pop channel back to the Sirius lineup for the first time since I-90 had signed off.  The decision to drop the original Pulse was because the channel ranked ninth in the Sirius ratings, whereas XM's counterpart channel, Flight 26, ranked second. Flight 26 was added to the Sirius lineup and rechristened on both services as the new Pulse, which still lists its calls as X026-FM.  The Bridge (which became Led Zeppelin Radio for two months) forced its move from channel 12 to channel 33 (replacing SIRIUS Disorder).

See also
 List of Sirius Satellite Radio stations

External links
 Sirius The Pulse

Defunct radio stations in the United States